The 2022 USAC Silver Crown Champ Car Series is the 51st season of Silver Crown racing under the USAC banner. The season began with the  Sumar Classic at Terre Haute Action Track on May 1 and is scheduled to end at Lucas Oil Indianapolis Raceway Park on October 22. The original 11-points race season for 2022 with one additional non-points special event to make the season 12 events was to be an equal split of races on dirt and asphalt. The 2022 season also featured full-season broadcast coverage on FloSports. Kody Swanson won his seventh USAC Silver Crown title.

Schedule and results
The 2022 schedule will feature eleven points paying races (with one special non points event and the 4-Crown Nationals night one being practice and qualifying only), with an equal split of six races each on dirt and asphalt.  The entire season will feature live and on-demand coverage on FloRacing. The August 20 Tony Bettenhausen 100 was postponed to October 15th due to heavy rain on race morning. Also the September 3rd Ted Horn 100 was postponed to September 5th due to rain.

Standings

Source:

Drivers

 Kody Swanson, 668
 Logan Seavey, 627
 C.J. Leary, 599
 Brian Tyler, 518
 Justin Grant, 517
 Travis Welpott, 404
 Bobby Santos III, 332
 Kyle Robbins, 325
 Gregg Cory (R), 319
 Taylor Ferns, 255

Owners

 #1 Doran-Dyson Racing, 668
 #222 Rice Motorsports, 627
 #6 Klatt Enterprises, 599
 #81 BCR Group, 518
 #91 Hemelgarn Racing, 517
 #18 Welpott Racing, 404
 #22 DJ Racing, 332
 #7 KR Racing, 325
 #32 Williams Racing, 319
 #155 Taylor Ferns Racing, 255

References

USAC Silver Crown Series
United States Auto Club